Charles Lucas (8 April 1838 – 30 September 1905) was a 19th-century French architect and writer.

Biography 
The son of architect Achille Lucas (1811–1889), Charles Lucas joined the école des beaux-arts de Paris in 1856 and studied with  then later at the école pratique des hautes études. He created the lessons of art history at the école Boulle and also designed the plans for the école Estienne.

Charles Lucas was a member of numerous learned societies including a corresponding member of the Société des Antiquaires de France

Some publications 
 1867: L'Espagne à l'Exposition universelle de 1867, aperçu des nombreux et intéressants envois de la Direction générale des travaux publics de Madrid
 1868: Biographie universelle des architectes célèbres
 1877: Le joyeulx dict de la commission du Manuel des lois du bâtiment...
 1881: Étude sur quelques monuments portugais, d'après des notes de M. le Cr da Silva
 1903: Achille Hermant, sa vie et ses œuvres, 1823 - Paris - 1903

References

External links 
 LUCAS Charles Louis Achille on CTHS

1838 births
Artists from Paris
1905 deaths
19th-century French architects
École des Beaux-Arts alumni
École pratique des hautes études alumni
Academic staff of the École pratique des hautes études
Knights of the Order of Christ (Portugal)